Bruno Étienne (born in 1937 in La Tronche, Isère, died in Aix-en-Provence on 4 March 2009 after a cancer) was a French sociologist, freemason and a political analyst. He was a specialist of Algeria, Islam and anthropology of the religious and masonic fact.

He graduated in Arabic-language and political sciences at the Institut d'études politiques d'Aix-en-Provence and the University of Tunis. Bruno Étienne was a researcher in Cairo and was a teacher at the ENA-Algiers, at the Law Faculty of Algiers and the universities of Casablanca and Marmara. He was also director of researches at the CNRS.

Teacher at the Institut d'études politiques d'Aix-en-Provence, he was the founder and was director until 2006 of the Observatoire du religieux. Bruno Étienne was also member of the Institut universitaire de France.

Bruno Étienne was the founder of a school of researchers in Aix-en-Provence including Raphaël Liogier, Jocelyne Cesari and Frank Fregosi. Gilles Kepel was also under his influence.

He was member of the Grand Orient de France and was a chevalier of the Légion d'honneur.

Bibliography
 By Bruno Étienne
L'islamisme radical, Paris, LGF, 1989.
La France et l'islam, Paris, Hachette, 1989.
Abdelkader, Paris, Hachette, 1994.
Une grenade entrouverte, La Tour d'Aigue, Aube ed., 1999.
L'Islam en France, Paris, CNRS Editions, 2000.
Ils ont rasé la Mésopotamie : du droit de coloniser au devoir d'ingérence, Paris, Eshel, 2000.
Les amants de l'apocalypse, La Tour d'Aigue, Aube ed., 2002.
L'Initiation, Paris, Dervy, 2002.
La France face aux sectes, Paris, Hachette, 2002.
Islam, les questions qui fâchent, Paris, Bayard, 2003.
Abd el-Kader : Le Magnanime (with François Pouillon), Paris, Gallimard, coll. "Découvertes Gallimard" (n° 431), 2003.
La voie de la main nue : Initiation et karaté-do, Paris, Dervy, 2004.
Être bouddhiste en France aujourd'hui (with Raphaël Liogier), Paris, Hachette, 2004.
Heureux comme Dieu en France ? : La République face aux religions, Paris, Bayard, 2005.
Pour retrouver la parole : Le retour des frères (with  Alain Bauer, Roger Dachez and Michel Maffesoli), La Table Ronde, 2006.
La spiritualité maçonnique : Pour redonner du sens à la vie, Paris, Dervy, 2006.
 Une voie pour l'occident, Dervy 2000

References

External links
 A tribute to Bruno Étienne, articles on Observatoire du Religieux
  Bruno Étienne association
  Interview on La pensée du Midi
  "France-Algérie, les douleurs de la mémoire" on La pensée du Midi
  "Étrange étrangeté d'une mère non étrangère" on La pensée du Midi
  "Fondement du politique en méditerranée" on La pensée du Midi
  "Fin du politique ou fin de la politique ?" on La pensée du Midi
  "Lois mémorielles ou abus de mémoire ?" on LDH-Toulon
  "Marseille ou l’Orient à domicile !" on LDH-Toulon
  "Pape : la ferveur et la laïcité" on Le Monde
  "Sans pères ni repères les groupes de pairs créent des repaires/repères", on La Science Politique

1937 births
2009 deaths
People from La Tronche
French sociologists
French scholars of Islam
French political scientists
Chevaliers of the Légion d'honneur
Sociologists of religion
Sciences Po Aix alumni
Tunis University alumni
Deaths from cancer in France
French Freemasons
Research directors of the French National Centre for Scientific Research